Ectonville is an unincorporated community in Clay County, Missouri, United States. It is part of the Kansas City metropolitan area.

Ectonville is located at  (39.367779, -94.478007).

The community was named after Dillie Ecton, a local merchant in the 1930s.

References

External links
 Google satellite map of Ectonville at Maplandia.com

Unincorporated communities in Clay County, Missouri
Unincorporated communities in Missouri